Darío Escobar (born 1971, Guatemala City) is a Guatemalan artist.

His work is characterized by the investigation of formal and conceptual aspects of objects and their function in visual arts.

Select one-person exhibitions
2016
 "Dario Escobar: Composições", Casa Triângulo, Sao Paulo, Brazil.

2015
 "En otro orden", the 9.99 gallery, Guatemala City, Guatemala.

2014
 Unions & Intersections, Nils Stærk Gallery, Copenhagen, Denmark.
 Broken circle, CAFAM Museum, Los Angeles, California

2013
 Pintura abstracta No. 7 / Abstract Painting No. 7, González & González, Santiago de Chile.
 Untitled, kamel mennour Galerie, Paris.
 Dario Escobar / Blacksmith Paintings, Josée Bienvenu Gallery, New York. 
 Dario Escobar / Línea & Espacio, ArteCentro,  Ciudad de Guatemala, Guatemala.

2012
 Dario Escobar (MAC) Museo de arte Contemporáneo de Santiago, Santiago, Chile.
 Dario Escobar: Singular Plural. SCAD Savannah - SCAD Museum of Art, Savannah, Georgia
 Dario Escobar: Singular Plural. SCAD Atlanta - Gallery 1600, Atlanta, Georgia
 Dario Escobar / trabajo reciente Baró Galeria, São Paulo, Brazil.

2011
 Dario Escobar / Revisión Museo Nacional de Arte Moderno Carlos Mérida, Guatemala City, Guatemala.

2010
 Side and Back, kamel mennour, Paris
 Anverso y Reverso, González y González, Santiago, Chile.

2008
 Playoffs, Josee Bienvenu Gallery, New York, New York.

2007
 La Línea Interrumpida, (CCM ) Centro Cultural Metropolitano, Guatemala City, Guatemala.
 Dario Escobar/Project room, Rotunda Gallery, Brooklyn, New York.

2006
 Objetos en Transito, Sala Gasco, Santiago, Chile.

2005
 Serpentario, (CCEG ) Centro Cultural de España Guatemala, Guatemala City, Guatemala.

2004
 Out! Galería Jacobo Karpio, Miami, Florida.

2003
 Espacios provisionales (MADC) Museo de Arte y Diseño Contemporáneo, San José, Costa Rica.
 Visual Entertainments, Museo de Arte Moderno de Mérida, Mérida, Mexico.

2001
 Dario Escobar, Trabajo reciente. Galería Jocobo Karpio, San José, Costa Rica.

2000
 Dario Escobar: Selección, II National Biennial of Lima, Peru.

Select group exhibitions
2016
 "FOOT FORAINE”, Gare Saint Sauveur, Lille, France.
 “GAME ON!” (CMA) Children's Museum of the Arts, New York.
 "Colección MAC. Obras Latinoamericanas”, Museo de arte Contemporáneo de Santiago, Santiago de Chile, Chile.

2015
 "...Pero no soy fotógrafo” The 9.99 Gallery, Guatemala.
 “10ª Bienal do Mercosul" Porto Alegre, Brazil.
 “Gold", Neuberger Museum of Art Purchase College, Purchase,   New York.
 “Coleccion Daros Latinamerica”, Fundación PROA, Buenos Aires.
 “Líneas de la Mano”,Sicardi Gallery, Houston, TX' 5 - RPM (Revoluciones por minuto)”, the 9.99 gallery, Guatemala city, Guatemala.
 Beleza?”, Centro Cultural São Paulo, Brazil.2014 Largo x Ancho x Alto / Height x Width x Depth”, the 9.99 gallery, Guatemala city, Guatemala.
 El día que nos hicimos contemporáneos" (MADC) Museo de arte y diseño, San José, Costa Rica.
 Gold”, Bass Museum of Art, Miami, Florida
 Fútbol: the beautiful game”, (LACMA) Los Angeles County Museum of Art, Los Angeles, California.
 Deslize", Openning of (MAR) Museu de Arte do Rio, Rio de Janeiro.2013 Confusion in the vault", Museo Jumex, México D.F.''
 Inaugural Exhibition”, the Pizzuti Collection, Columbus, Ohio.
 California-Pacific Triennial”, (OCMA) Orange County Museum of Art, Newport Beach, California / (CCC) Coastline Community College Art Gallery, Newport Beach, California.
 y... ¿entonces? / and... so?”, the 9.99, Guatemala City, Guatemala.
 The Collaborative: Question in the line” (MOLAA) Museum of Latin American Art, Long Beach, California.2012 Futbol. Arte y pasión”, (MARCO) Museo de Arte Contemporáneo de Monterrey, Monterrey, México.
 The Island / A game of life”, Gallery One, Manarat al Saadiyat, Abu Dhabi.
 Play with me”, (MOLAA) Museum of Latin American Art, Long Beach, California.2011 Now Selected works from the Jumex Collection, Instituto Cultural Cabañas, Guadalajara, Mexico.
 Video otra vez, Museo de Arte Contemporáneo de Fortaleza, Fortaleza, Brazil.
 Proyecto ideal, Centro Cultural de São Paulo, São Paulo, Brazil.
 From the Recent Past: New Acquisitions, (MOCA) The Museum of Contemporary Art, Los Angeles, California.2010 Chapter II: Ruido, 9.99/proyecto, Guatemala City, Guatemala.
 Proyecto Ideal, (MAC ) Museo de arte Contemporáneo de Santiago, Santiago, Chile.
 Optimismo Radical, Josee Bienvenu Gallery, New York, New York.
 XVII Bienal de Guatemala, (CCM ) Centro Cultural Metropolitano, Guatemala City, Guatemala.
 Efecto Drácula, Museo Universitario del CHOPO, Mexico City, Mexico.
 Social Affects: A selection from the permanent Collection of the David Rockefeller Center for Latin America Studies/ Harvard University. Boston Center for the arts/ Mills Gallery, Boston, Massachusetts.
 Four Views from the Permanent Collection exhibition (MOLAA) Museum of Latin American Art, Long Beach, California.2009 Los impoliticos, (PAN ) Palazzo delle Arti Napoli, Naples, Italy.
 10 Springs in the fall, kamel mennour, Paris.
 Périfériks, (CAN) Centre d’art Neuchâtel, Neuchâtel, Switzerland.
 Mundus Novus: 53 Bienal Internacional de Venecia, Artiglerie dell’Arsenale, Venice, Italy.
 0.3333333333333333…, 9.99/proyecto, Guatemala City, Guatemala.
 La nada y el ser, Septima interpretación de La Colección Jumex, La Colección Jumex, Ecatepec, Mexico City, Mexico.
 Video otra vez, Metales Pesados, Santiago de Chile, Chile.
 Performing Localities, (INIVA ) Institute of International Visual Arts, London, England.
 X Bienal de La Habana, Fortaleza de San Carlos de la Cabaña, Havana, Cuba.2008 La invención de lo cotidiano, (MUNAL) Museo Nacional de Arte, Mexico City, Mexico.
 Object of Value, (MAC -MAM) Miami Art Central, Miami, Florida.
 Playtime, Bétonsalon/ Centre d’art et de recherche, Paris, France.
 World Histories, Des Moines Art Center, Des Moines, Iowa.
 Visions From Abroad, Flushing Town Hall, New York, New York.
 Elefante negro, Museo Diego Rivera, Mexico City, Mexico.2007 Fortunate Object, (CIFO ) Cisneros Fontanalls Art Foundations, Miami, Florida.
 Silence & Echo, Arena 1, Santa Monica, California.
 The Hours: Visual Arts of Contemporary Latin America, Museum of Contemporary Art, Sydney, Australia.
 Poetics of the Handmade The Museum of Contemporary Art (MOCA), Los Angeles, California.2006 El esquiador en el fondo del pozo, Quinta interpretación de La Colección Jumex, La Colección Jumex, Ecatepec, Mexico City, Mexico.
 Stil Biuti, Centro de Arte Contemporáneo Zamek Ujazdowski, Warsaw, Poland.
 The Beautiful Game: Contemporary Art and Fútbol, (BAM) Brooklyn Academy of Music, Brooklyn, New York.
 Constant Disturbance, The Spanish Cultural Center, Miami, Florida.2005 The Hours. Visual Arts of Contemporary Latin America, Dublin Museum, Ireland
 Living for the city Jack Shainman Gallery, New York, New York / (CIEL) CentreInternational d’Expositions de Larouche, Toronto, Canada.2004 Newspapers, Josee Bienvenu Gallery, New York, New York.2003 Intangible, (MADC) Museo de Arte y Diseño Contemporáneo, San José, Costa Rica.
 LA Freeways: Latin America, (MOCA) The Museum of Contemporary Art, Los Angeles, California / America's Society, New York, New York (2004).
 RAIN Project, Pabellón Cuba, Havana, Cuba.
 Stretch, The Power Plant, Toronto, Canada.
 TransEAT , Food Culture Museum, Miami, Florida.
 VIII Bienal de la Habana, Centro Wifredo Lam, Havana, Cuba.2002 ART itsmo, (MADC) Museo de Arte y Diseño Contemporáneo, San José, Costa Rica.
 Contaminados, (MADC) Museo de Arte y Diseño Contemporáneo, San José, Costa Rica.
 Del centro a la isla, Casa de las Américas, Havana, Cuba.
 Intimate/Universal, Ateneo de Caracas, Caracas, Venezuela.
 Mesoamérica: Oscilaciones y Artificios, (CAAM) Centro Atlántico de Arte Moderno, Canary Islands, Spain.
 Zones in Tension, de GANG Gallery, Harlem, the Netherlands.2001 Continuous Connection, Felissimo Project, New York, New York.
 Short Stories, La Fabbrica del Vapore, Milan, Italy.
 Spaces/Bodies/Identities, Centro Cultural de España, San José, Costa Rica.
 13 Hours, Sala Mendoza, Caracas, Venezuela.
 I Tirana Biennial, National Gallery & Chinese Pavilion, Tirana, Albania.
 IV Caribbean Biennial, Museo de Arte Moderno, Santo Domingo, Dominican Republic.
 Barro de América IV Biennial, Museo de Arte Contemporáneo Sofía Imber, Caracas, Venezuela.2000 2eme. Biennale du Design 2000, Ecole des Beaux Arts de Saint-Etienne, Saint-Etienne, France.
 L’ art dans le monde, Pont Alexandre III, Paris, France.1999 Guatemalan Art, Sala Oficial Juan Ismael del Cabildo de Fuerteventura, Canary Islands, Spain.
 II Iberoamerican Biennial of Lima, Lima, Peru.1998 Fotojornada’98, Museo Nacional de Arte Moderno Carlos Mérida, Guatemala City, Guatemala.
 Without Title, Plaza G&T; Guatemala City, Guatemala.
 I Central American Biennale, Centro Cultural Miguel Angel Asturias, Guatemala City, Guatemala / (DUMA) Duke University Museum of Art, North Carolina.
 VI International Art Biennale of Cuenca, Cuenca, Ecuador.1997'''
 La Joven Estampa, Casa de las Américas, Havana, Cuba.

Lectures

 Dario Escobar Lecture: The Experience of the Object. Events Space, SCAD Atlanta, Georgia. February, 2012
 Uno a Uno: Darío Escobar y José Falconí. [One on One: Darío Escobar and José Falconí] Auditorium AFP Integra at the Museum of Art of Lima MALI. Lima, Peru. May 2011
 Artist on Their Art Series: Darío Escobar. David Rockefeller Center for Latin American Studies (DRCLAS) Harvard University. November, 2010
 Mirar de Nuevo: El objeto reconsiderado. [Look again: the reconsidered object] National School of Fine Arts (ENAP), Guatemala, Guatemala. April 2010.
 Work and recent projects'' panel with Sara Reisman, Americas Society / Pinta New York. November, 2009.
 Darío Escobar: Cátedra y crítica magistral. [Darío Escobar: magisterial class and critic] New Amphitheater of the Hospital de la Concepción building, School of Fine Arts. Old San Juan, Puerto Rico. November, 2003.

External links
 Official Darío Escobar Website
 kamel mennour - Dario Escobar
 Nils Staerk - Dario Escobar
 the 9.99 gallery - Dario Escobar

Living people
1971 births
Guatemalan artists
Guatemalan contemporary artists